Leon Preston Robinson (born March 8, 1962), usually credited as simply Leon, is an American actor who began his professional career as a film actor in the early 1980s. Robinson is best known for his roles as David Ruffin in the TV film The Temptations (1998), J.T. Matthews in the 1991 Robert Townsend film The Five Heartbeats, Derice Bannock in the 1993 film Cool Runnings, Shep in the 1994 basketball drama film Above the Rim, and Little Richard in the 2000 film Little Richard.

Career 
Robinson appeared in a 1989 episode of the NBC series Midnight Caller, in which he played an athlete who falls victim to crack cocaine. He also co-starred in the 1989 ABC miniseries The Women of Brewster Place, as the boyfriend of a suburbanite (played by Robin Givens). He was cast as Saint Martin de Porres in Madonna's controversial 1989 music video "Like a Prayer".

Robinson's early film roles included a football teammate of Tom Cruise in All the Right Moves (1983) as Shadow Nading, and the Notre Dame-bound basketball playing co-worker of Matt Dillon, in The Flamingo Kid (1984). He co-starred in the Michael Mann-produced Tri-Star Pictures film Band of the Hand, as well as the "Killer Bee" in the Dennis Hopper-directed gang film Colors, starring Sean Penn and Robert Duvall. After his exposure in the 1989 video for the song "Like a Prayer" by Madonna, he played a leading role in the 1993 Disney film Cool Runnings. That same year, he co-starred as John Lithgow's henchman in Renny Harlin's Cliffhanger and followed with a turn as a disillusioned ex-jock in New Line Cinema's Above the Rim (1994). Robinson also appeared as Lela Rochon's the married lover in 1995's Waiting to Exhale directed by Forest Whitaker and starring Whitney Houston and a starring role in the Merchant/Ivory produced movie, Side Streets with Rosario Dawson. He produced as well as starred in the 1997 romantic drama The Price of Kissing with TV star Pauley Perrette. He also starred in the  movie Once Upon a Time When We Were Colored, directed by Tim Reid and winner of Best Picture at the NAACP Image Awards.

Robinson has received critical acclaim for his portrayal of three singers: David Ruffin in the 1998 NBC miniseries The Temptations, Little Richard in the self-titled 2000 NBC movie biography, and JT in the 20th Century Fox movie, The Five Heartbeats directed by Robert Townsend. He received an Emmy nomination for his portrayal of Little Richard.  During this period, Robinson joined the ensemble cast of two TV series, playing the popular Jefferson Keane on HBO's first series, Oz and as Lawrence Hill on Showtime's Resurrection Blvd., a costarring  role as "Stoney" best friend of Joaquin Phoenix in Miramax' military drama Buffalo Soldiers, an uncredited role as "Joseph 13 X" in Michael Mann's award-winning biopic, Ali starring Will Smith, in addition to briefly hosting his own late-night talk show, The L-Bow Room, on BET.

In 2008, Robinson starred in the 20th Century Fox thriller Cover, directed by Bill Duke, and starred alongside Danny Masterson and Dominique Swain in the indie comedy The Brooklyn Heist, directed by Julian Mark Kheel. In 2009, AOL Black Voices voted Robinson one of the Sexiest Actors of All-time. Between 2013 and 2014, he appeared in four movies, the romantic comedy I Really Hate My Ex, written and directed by Troy Beyer, the southern drama Soul Ties, based on the book by Tee Austin, the indie rock/drama 37 the romantic drama, And Then There Was You with Garcelle Beauvais.
Stars in "40 & single" 2018.

Theater
In theater, Robinson has headlined three national tours, with sold-out performances at Hollywood's Kodak Theatre, NYC's Beacon Theatre, Detroit's Fox Theater, Washington, DC's Warner Theater and more in Friends and Lovers (2005), based on Eric Jerome Dickey's NY Times bestselling book. In 2009 and 2010 as a soldier returning from Iraq in 3 Ways to Get A Husband co-starring Billy Dee Williams and in 2012, the revival of Why Do Good Girls Like Bad Boys.

Music
Robinson is the lead vocalist and songwriter of the band, Leon and the Peoples. In 2007, he received an International Reggae and World Music Award nomination for the band's debut CD The Road Less Traveled, winner of Best International Artist at the Joe Higgs Reggae Awards and completed a 36 city US tour with reggae greats Beres Hammond and Marcia Griffiths titled the "For The Love Of It Tour". He was a frequent guest on Beres Hammond's 2008 and 2010 North American tours. He head-lined NYC's Central Park 2010 and 2013 AIDS Walk Concerts. Other performances include the 2011 Aspen Jazz Fest., 2012 Catalpa NYC Music Festival, New Orleans Music Festival, Chicago's Festival Of Life, Reggae on River, Jamaica's Rebel Salute, and BET's popular 106 & Park.

Leon and The Peoples' single, Love Is A Beautiful Thing was featured on the BET/Centric TV show Culture List, which premiered on July 21, 2013. Leon & The Peoples' 2nd album Love Is A Beautiful Thing was released on the Spectra Music label on July 20, 2018, with the title track debuting at No. 3 on Billboards Hot Singles Chart and the next single 'Beautiful' charting on the same Billboard chart at No. 12.

Filmography

Film

Television

Music Video

References

External links 

Leon's official website

Living people
African-American male actors
American male film actors
American male television actors
Male actors from New York City
Singers from New York City
1962 births
20th-century African-American male singers
21st-century African-American male singers